Andrej Kmeť (19 November 1841, Szénásfalu, Austrian Empire (today Bzenica, Slovakia) - 16 February 1908, Turócszentmárton (today Martin, Slovakia)) was a Slovak botanist, ethnographer, archaeologist, and geologist. He identified several new species of plants and created a herbarium with 72,000 specimens. He was one of the first researchers who carried on modern archaeological excavations in Central Europe. In 1892, he founded the Slovak Learned Society, which later became nucleus of the Slovak Academy of Sciences. He was also known for his bitter criticism of alcoholism. Andrej Kmeť was interred in the National Cemetery in Martin.

Works online 
 Sitno a co s neho vidieť. Ružomberok: Fr. Rich. Osvald, 1901. 140 p. - available at ULB Digital Library

References

External links

 Biography of Andrej Kmeť 
 Andrej Kmeť Museum 

1841 births
1908 deaths
People from Žiar nad Hronom District
Slovak botanists
Slovak Roman Catholic priests
Burials at National Cemetery in Martin
19th-century Austrian Roman Catholic priests